Farid Nametalievich Babayev (1959 – 2007) was a Russian politician with the liberal anti-Kremlin Yabloko party.

Career
Babayev was a candidate of the regional list for the  party in the 2 December elections.

Death
Babayev was shot late 21 November 2007 in the entryway of his apartment building in Makhachkala, the capital of Dagestan. Doctors said he was shot four times, including at least once in the head. He died on 24 November of his wounds.

References

1959 births
2007 deaths
Deaths by firearm in Russia
Yabloko politicians
Assassinated Russian politicians
People murdered in Russia